Montlaur is a commune in the Aveyron department in southern France.

Geography
The Dourdou de Camarès forms part of the commune's southeastern border, flows northwestward through the middle of the commune, then forms part of its northwestern border.

The village lies in the northern part of the commune, on the left bank of the Dourdou de Camarès.

Population

See also
Communes of the Aveyron department

References

Communes of Aveyron
Aveyron communes articles needing translation from French Wikipedia